Archibald Garden Wernham (4 March 1916; 7 May 1989) was a 20th-century Scottish philosopher.

Wernham was born in Kirkcaldy and educated at Robert Gordon's College; Aberdeen University; and Balliol College, Oxford.
 He served in World War II with the Royal Artillery. He was lecturer, reader and then Regius Professor of Moral Philosophy at the University of Aberdeen from 1945 to 1981.

References

Scottish philosophers
Military personnel from Fife
1916 births
1989 deaths
Alumni of the University of Aberdeen
Academics of the University of Aberdeen
20th-century British philosophers
People educated at Robert Gordon's College
Alumni of Balliol College, Oxford
Royal Artillery personnel
British Army personnel of World War II
People from Kirkcaldy